Eugenia uxpanapensis is a species of plant in the family Myrtaceae.  It is endemic to the Uxpanapa region of Veracruz state in eastern Mexico.

References

uxpanapensis
Endemic flora of Mexico
Trees of Veracruz
Endangered biota of Mexico
Endangered flora of North America
Taxonomy articles created by Polbot